Nevado Sajama, highest mountain in Bolivia
 Illimani
 Janq'u Uma
 Illampu
 Huayna Potosi
 Chachacomani

Bolivia
 
mountains
Bolivia